Woh Tera Naam Tha is a 2004 Indian Hindi-language film starring Arjan Bajwa, Kanchi Kaul and Amrish Puri. The music was composed by Roop Kumar Rathod. The cinematographer was by Manmohan Singh.

Synopsis  
Orphaned at a very young age, Badruddin "Badru" is taken in by the kind-hearted Ustad Samad Khan, a once popular singer in Bhopal, Madhya Pradesh. Samad, once well known for his performances, gave up singing after he found his audience to be distracted during one of his shows.

Badru is attracted to Samad's daughter, Reshma, who also likes him. Badru has another admirer in the beautiful Naseem, but does not reciprocate her love. When Akhtar, a freelance photographer from Delhi, arrives, Reshma and he instantly fall in love, and Badru is heartbroken.

When Akhtar proposes marriage, Samad angrily rejects him, as he wants Reshma to marry Nawab Hyder Ali's son, Basharat. His angry outburst has repercussions and Samad is hospitalized. To raise money for his treatment, Reshma decides to take part in a singing competition and wins. Samad returns home to start preparations for Reshma's marriage but to his astonishment, he discovers that Reshma has already turned down Basharat's proposal. Basharat decides to take matters into his own hands and tries to forcibly marry Reshma.

Cast 

 Arjan Bajwa as Akhtar
 Kanchi Kaul as Reshma Khan
 Amrish Puri as Ustad Samad Khan, Reshma's father
 Gaurav Chanana as Badruddin "Badru"
 Rajat Bedi as Basharat
 Shalini Pal as Naseem

Reception
Taran Adarsh wrote that "On all, 'Woh Tera Naam Tha' is a formulaic film but it was mentioned that "given mentality of current audiences, a subject like this will hardly find takers" . A critic from Deccan Herald wrote that "It remains to be seen whether Singhania’s prowess in the industrial field will repeat itself in Bollywood".

Music
"Ashqaan Di" - Reshma
"Baju Band" - Pt. Rajan Mishra
"Jaan Lo Jaan Lo (Qawwali)" - Sadhana Sargam, Sabri Brothers
"Kabhi Dil Se Kam" - Udit Narayan, Alka Yagnik
"Noor-E-Nazar' - Roop Kumar Rathod
"Sajan Ghar Challi Re" - Alka Yagnik, Richa Sharma
"Subah Hui" - Alka Yagnik
"Woh Jo Jaan-E-Jaan" - Hariharan
"Woh Tera Naam Tha" - Roop Kumar Rathod
"Woh Tera Naam Tha (Sad)" - Roop Kumar Rathod
"Youn To Mohabbat Ka" - Udit Narayan, Alka Yagnik

References

2000s Hindi-language films
Films scored by Dilip Sen-Sameer Sen
Films directed by Kuku Kohli